Passage West is a 1951 American Technicolor Western film directed by Lewis R. Foster starring John Payne, Dennis O'Keefe and Arleen Whelan.

Plot
Six convicts led by Pete Black pull a Utah prison break. They intercept a California-bound wagon train and interrupt a child's funeral. Demanding the wagons leave immediately, they anger Rose Billings, a woman in a black dress mourning her father, but wagon train leader Jacob Karns, a preacher who plans to marry Rose, thinks it best to obey the men.

Curly, one of the prisoners, makes a pass at Rose and is whipped by Pete. He fancies the woman for himself, but Rose picks up the whip and uses it on him. Pete is not so much irate as impressed.

At a fork on the trail, Pete insists the wagons risk a faster but more dangerous route. Soon they are trapped in dust and rain storms. A cow dies, and without milk, a baby dies. Rose changes clothes to something more frilly, feeling it time for her mourning to end, but when Pete shows an interest in her, Karns fights and defeats him.

Curly steals money from the travelers and shoots Pete, who is surprised when Karns and Rose willingly tend to his wound. Karns admits that he once led a wild life the way Pete now does. He appeals to Pete to change.

Reaching a town, the fugitives discover gold in a cave and their greed gets the best of them. Gunfire ensues, and Pete, guilty and tired, sets off a charge of dynamite to bury all of his men as well as himself.

Cast
 John Payne as Pete Black
 Arleen Whelan as Rose Billings
 Dennis O'Keefe as Jacob Karns
 Frank Faylen as Curly
 Mar Anderson as Myra Johnson
 Peter Hansen as Michael Karns
 Richard Rober as Mike
 Mary Beth Hughes as Nellie McBride
 Griff Barnett as Papa Emil Ludwig
 Mary Field as Miss Swingate
 Dooley Wilson as Rainbow
 Richard Travis as Ben Johnson
 Lillian Bronson as Bom Brennan 
 Arthur Hunnicutt as Pop Brennan
 Ilka Grüning as Mama Ludwig (as Ilka Gruning)

References

External links

1951 films
1951 Western (genre) films
American Western (genre) films
Films directed by Lewis R. Foster
1950s English-language films
1950s American films